Ravasi is an Italian surname. Notable people with the surname include:

Ambrogio Ravasi (1929–2020), Italian-born Kenyan Roman Catholic bishop
Edward Ravasi (born 1994), Italian cyclist
Fabrizio Ravasi (born 1965), Italian lightweight rower
Gianfranco Ravasi (born 1942), Italian cardinal
Jacopo Ravasi (born 1987), Italian footballer

Italian-language surnames
Surnames of Italian origin